Angelo Mariani may refer to:

Angelo Mariani (conductor) (1821–1873), Italian conductor
Angelo Mariani (chemist) (1838–1914), French chemist